Trịnh Bửu Hoài (Mỹ Đức, Châu Phú, 16 May 1952) is a Vietnamese poet.

Publications
Poetry collections unless other genre indicated:
Thơ tình (1974)
Mùa trăng (1984)
Giữa hai mùa hẹn ước (trường ca, 1985)
Nửa tuần trăng mật (novel, 1989)
Quê xa (1994)
Lẽo đẽo bụi hồng (1995)
Vườn chim áo trắng (1988)
Tứ tuyệt mùa xuân (2000)
Ký ức (2002)
Màu tím học trò (story, 2003)
Chim xa cành (short story, 2004)
Ngan ngát mùa xưa (2005)

References

20th-century Vietnamese poets
1952 births
Living people
People from An Giang Province
21st-century Vietnamese poets
Vietnamese male poets
20th-century male writers
21st-century male writers